Stein Dorenfeldt Tønnesson (born 2 December 1953), is a Norwegian historian.

Career
He was the director of the Peace Research Institute Oslo (PRIO) from 2001 to 2009, when he was replaced by Kristian Berg Harpviken. Stein Tønnesson stays on at PRIO as a Research Professor, while at the United States Institute of Peace (USIP) as Jennings Randolph Senior Fellow 2010-11.

Educated at the University of Aarhus and the University of Oslo, he received his dr. philos. in history from the University of Oslo in 1991. Tønnesson's foremost research efforts have been revolution and war in Vietnam, national identity in South-East Asia, the South China Sea conflict, and Norwegian sports history. Tønnesson has also worked as a journalist. His interests the past decade has been in particular global history, globalization and the decades of relative peace in south east Asia since 1979.

Stein Tønnesson has worked as Professor of Human Development Studies at the Centre for Development and the Environment (SUM) at the University of Oslo, and has also been a senior research fellow at the Nordic Institute for Asia Studies (NIAS) in Copenhagen.

Personal life
He is a son of professor of history, Kåre Tønnesson. He grew up in Bærum and attended Oslo Cathedral School.

References

External links
 Cliostein (Tønnesson's web site)
 Homepage at PRIO

1953 births
Living people
Writers from Bærum
Norwegian journalists
20th-century Norwegian historians
Aarhus University alumni
University of Oslo alumni
Academic staff of the University of Oslo
Writers from Oslo
Historians of the Vietnam War